The Pesa is a river in Italy

Pesa or PESA may also refer to:
Pesa (currency), a subdivision of the German East African rupie
Percutaneous epididymal sperm aspiration
Passive electronically scanned array
Progression of Early Subclinical Atherosclerosis
Public Expenditure Statistical Analyses
Pesa, Polish train and tram manufacturer
Pesa Twist, a three-carriage low floor tram
Panchayats (Extension to Scheduled Areas) Act 1996, Indian legislation

People with the surname Pesa
Njego Pesa (born 1958), Yugoslav-American association football player

See also